Maurice Viollette (3 September 1870 in Janville, Eure-et-Loir – 9 September 1960 in Dreux) was a French statesman.

He was chief-of-staff for Alexandre Millerand in the Waldeck-Rousseau government in 1898, and was elected as a député for Eure-et-Loir in 1902 and as mayor of Dreux from 1908–1959.

He acted as Transport and Supply Minister in 1917, Governor General of Algeria from 1925 to 1927, Minister of State for the Front Populaire, and author of the Blum-Viollette proposal of 1936, which proposed to grant French citizenship to Algerian elites.  Ousted and placed under house arrest by the Vichy government, he was re-elected after the liberation and remained mayor and député of Dreux and president of the Conseil Général of Eure-et-Loir until his death in 1960 at age 90.

References

External links
Biography and photos on the page of the French Radical Left party (in French)

1870 births
1960 deaths
Deputies of Eure-et-Loir
Radical Party (France) politicians
Republican-Socialist Party politicians
Democratic and Socialist Union of the Resistance politicians
Members of the 8th Chamber of Deputies of the French Third Republic
Members of the 9th Chamber of Deputies of the French Third Republic
Members of the 10th Chamber of Deputies of the French Third Republic
Members of the 11th Chamber of Deputies of the French Third Republic
Members of the 13th Chamber of Deputies of the French Third Republic
Members of the 14th Chamber of Deputies of the French Third Republic
French Senators of the Third Republic
Senators of Eure-et-Loir
Members of the Constituent Assembly of France (1945)
Members of the Constituent Assembly of France (1946)
Deputies of the 1st National Assembly of the French Fourth Republic
Deputies of the 2nd National Assembly of the French Fourth Republic
Mayors of Eure-et-Loir
Governors general of Algeria